"Declaration (This is It)" is a gospel song by Kirk Franklin from his 2007 album The Fight of My Life. The song contains samples of and interpolations of "This Is It" by Michael McDonald and Kenny Loggins who are credited with Franklin as composers of the song.

Charts
"Declaration (This Is It)" became a crossover hit, moving to #13 on the U.S. Billboard Hot Adult R&B Airplay Chart and #35 on the U.S. Billboard Hot R&B/Hip-Hop Songs Chart.

Personnel

Vocals
Anaysha Figueroa
Charmaine Swimpson 
Ashley Guilbert
Nikki Ross
Melodie Davis
Issac Carree
Joy Hill
Myron Bulter
Caltomeesh west
Deonis Cook
Anthony Evans

Instruments
Robert "Sput Searight - Drums
Ayron Lewis - Hammond B-3
Rodney Lawson - Lead guitar
DaBoyz'nBarry - Strings & Horns

Other personnel
Programming - Shaun Martin, Kirk Franklin
Ernest "Ernie G" Green - DJ
Larry Gold - String arrangement
Chris Godbey - String recording
Tre Nagella - String recording
Eric Hartman - Engineer, Asst. Engineer
Ryan Moys - String recording
Jason Goldstein - Mixing

*Note: Personnel listing from The Fight of My Life album liner.

Awards

The song was nominated for a Dove Award for Urban Recorded Song of the Year at the 40th GMA Dove Awards.

References

External links
Music video at Yahoo! Music
Song lyrics at Yahoo! Music

2007 singles
2007 songs
Gospel songs
Kirk Franklin songs
Songs written by Kirk Franklin
Songs written by Kenny Loggins
Songs written by Michael McDonald (musician)